German submarine U-1000 was a Type VIIC/41 U-boat built during World War II for service in Nazi Germany's Kriegsmarine.

Design
German Type VIIC/41 submarines were preceded by the heavier Type VIIC submarines. U-1000 had a displacement of  when at the surface and  while submerged. She had two shafts and two  propellers.

U-1000 was fitted with five  torpedo tubes (four fitted at the bow and one at the stern), fourteen torpedoes, one  SK C/35 naval gun, (220 rounds), one  Flak M42 and two  C/30 anti-aircraft guns. The boat had a complement of between forty-four and sixty.

Service history
She was completed in Hamburg in November 1943, and after working up trials was moved to Egersund in Norway in June 1944. From there she conducted her only war patrol in the waters off Norway, in the North Sea and towards the Arctic Circle, but found no enemy ships to target, returning to Bergen without firing a shot. She did however manage to recover two Norwegian airmen of the British Royal Air Force, whose Mosquito aircraft had been shot down by  two days before they were rescued from the sea.

On the 9 August, U-1000 was detailed to serve in the Baltic Sea against Soviet shipping, which was beginning to press into German waters as the Red Army advanced on land.

Fate
On the 31 August 1944, as she passed the East Prussian town of Pillau on her way to Reval, she struck a sea mine laid by the Royal Air Force. The mine crippled the submarine, which limped into Pillau in a wrecked state. RAF aircraft frequently mined German coastal waters, as they knew the routes used by German shipping, and could thus severely restrict German movement by sea with the use of air-dropped minefields.

See also
 Battle of the Atlantic (1939-1945)

References

Bibliography

External links

World War II submarines of Germany
German Type VIIC/41 submarines
U-boats sunk by mines
World War II shipwrecks in the Baltic Sea
U-boats commissioned in 1943
U-boats sunk in 1944
1943 ships
Ships built in Hamburg
Maritime incidents in August 1944